The 2007 Chicago Sky season was the 2nd season in the WNBA for the Chicago Sky. Bo Overton was hired to be the new Head Coach and General Manager after Dave Cowens resigned following the 2006 season.

Armintie Price became the first player in Sky history to be named WNBA Rookie of the Year.

Transactions

Charlotte Sting Dispersal Draft
With the Charlotte Sting ceasing operation and based on the 2006 records of teams, the Sky selected 1st in the Dispersal Draft.

WNBA Draft

Trades and Roster Changes

Roster
{| class="toccolours" style="font-size: 95%; width: 100%;"
|-
! colspan="2"  style="background:#4b90cc; color:#Fbb726"|2007 Chicago Sky Roster
|- style="text-align:center; background-color:#Fbb726; color:#FFFFFF;"
! Players !! Coaches
|- 
| valign="top" |
{| class="sortable" style="background:transparent; margin:0px; width:100%;"
! Pos. !! # !! Nat. !! Name !! Ht. !! Wt. !! From
|-

Depth

Schedule

Regular Season

|- style="background:#fcc;"
| 1
| May 20
| @ New York
| 71-83
| Monique Currie (20)
| DupreeCurre (10)
| Armintie Price (8)
| Madison Square Garden  11,341
| 0-1
|- style="background:#fcc;"
| 2
| May 22
| Los Angeles
| 64-81
| Dominique Canty (18)
| Kayte Christensen (8)
| Dominique Canty (4)
| UIC Pavilion  5,140
| 0-2
|- style="background:#cfc;"
| 3
| May 25
| @ Minnesota
| 82-77
| Candice Dupree (25)
| Kayte Christensen (7)
| Stacey Dales (6)
| Target Center  4,891
| 1-2
|- style="background:#fcc;"
| 4
| May 31
| Connecticut
| 97-102 OT
| Candice Dupree (29)
| DupreeWyckoff (7)
| Brooke Wyckoff (10)
| UIC Pavilion  2,634
| 1-3

|- style="background:#cfc;"
| 5
| June 1
| @ Washington
| 75-70
| DupreePerkins (19)
| Chasity Melvin (15)
| Dominique Canty (7)
| Verizon Center  6,391
| 2-3
|- style="background:#cfc;"
| 6
| June 3
| Minnesota
| 78-72
| Candice Dupree (20)
| Candice Dupree (11)
| Dominique Canty (5)
| UIC Pavilion  3,477
| 3-3
|- style="background:#fcc;"
| 7
| June 7
| @ Phoenix
| 66-80
| Chasity Melvin (15)
| Chasity Melvin (11)
| CantyMelvin (3)
| US Airways Center  6,161
| 3-4
|- style="background:#cfc;"
| 8
| June 9
| @ San Antonio
| 70-60
| Candice Dupree (22)
| Chasity Melvin (12)
| Stacey Dales (5)
| AT&T Center  9,899
| 4-4
|- style="background:#fcc;"
| 9
| June 12
| Seattle
| 69-81
| Candice Dupree (18)
| Armintie Price (12)
| Stacey Dales (7)
| UIC Pavilion  2,645
| 4-5
|- style="background:#cfc;"
| 10
| June 15
| New York
| 73-66
| Candice Dupree (24)
| Candice Dupree (13)
| Armintie Price (6)
| UIC Pavilion  3,236
| 5-5
|- style="background:#cfc;"
| 11
| June 17
| @ Connecticut
| 87-74
| Candice Dupree (28)
| DupreeMelvin (8)
| Dominique Canty (6)
| Mohegan Sun Arena  7,614
| 6-5
|- style="background:#fcc;"
| 12
| June 19
| Sacramento
| 52-54
| Candice Dupree (21)
| Candice Dupree (14)
| Dominique Canty (7)
| UIC Pavilion  2,505
| 6-6
|- style="background:#fcc;"
| 13
| June 23
| Washington
| 86-99
| Candice Dupree (26)
| MelvinPrice (9)
| Armintie Price (6)
| UIC Pavilion  3,617
| 6-7
|- style="background:#fcc;"
| 14
| June 26
| @ Seattle
| 76-94
| Jia Perkins (19)
| DupreePricePerkins (7)
| PriceDupreeRaymond (4)
| KeyArena  6,752
| 6-8
|- style="background:#cfc;"
| 15
| June 29
| @ Sacramento
| 92-84 2OT
| Jia Perkins (39)
| Armintie Price (9)
| Jia Perkins (10)
| ARCO Arena  6,862
| 7-8

|- style="background:#cfc;"
| 16
| July 1
| @ Los Angeles
| 74-71 OT
| Candice Dupree (24)
| Candice Dupree (11)
| Armintie Price (6)
| Staples Center  7,522
| 8-8
|- style="background:#fcc;"
| 17
| July 7
| Washington
| 73-77
| Candice Dupree (24)
| Candice Dupree (11)
| Stacey Dales (6)
| UIC Pavilion  3,161
| 8-9
|- style="background:#fcc;"
| 18
| July 8
| @ Indiana
| 70-86
| Catherine Joens (16)
| Candice Dupree (9)
| Jia Perkins (4)
| Bankers Life Fieldhouse  8,247
| 8-10
|- style="background:#fcc;"
| 19
| July 10
| @ Detroit
| 84-92
| Jia Perkins (22)
| Candice Dupree (10)
| Jia Perkins (4)
| Palace of Auburn Hills  8,975
| 8-11
|- style="background:#fcc;"
| 20
| July 12
| Detroit
| 65-78
| Jia Perkins (17)
| Candice Dupree (6)
| Catherine Joens (5)
| UIC Pavilion  3,085
| 8-12
|- style="background:#fcc;"
| 21
| July 18
| @ Indiana
| 74-75
| Jia Perkins (24)
| Armintie Price (7)
| PriceCanty (3)
| Bankers Life Fieldhouse  10,542
| 8-13
|- style="background:#cfc;"
| 22
| July 21
| Indiana
| 68-65
| Jia Perkins (17)
| Armintie Price (8)
| Dominique Canty (5)
| UIC Pavilion  3,383
| 9-13
|- style="background:#cfc;"
| 23
| July 22
| San Antonio
| 84-82 OT
| Jia Perkins (27)
| Armintie Price (7)
| Stacey Dales (4)
| UIC Pavilion  3,286
| 10-13
|- style="background:#cfc;"
| 24
| July 26
| @ Detroit
| 83-73
| Candice Dupree (24)
| Candice Dupree (12)
| Dominique Canty (5)
| Palace of Auburn Hills  9,238
| 11-13
|- style="background:#fcc;"
| 25
| July 27
| Phoenix
| 96-98
| Stacey Dales (23)
| MelvinPrice (8)
| Dominique Canty (8)
| UIC Pavilion  4,053
| 11-14
|- style="background:#cfc;"
| 26
| July 29
| Houston
| 88-70
| Stacey Dales (18)
| Chasity Melvin (5)
| Dominique Canty (8)
| UIC Pavilion  3,469
| 12-14
|- style="background:#fcc;"
| 27
| July 31
| @ Connecticut
| 56-74
| Jia Perkins (17)
| DupreePerkins (7)
| CantyJoens (3)
| Mohegan Sun Arena  8,048
| 12-15

|- style="background:#fcc;"
| 28
| August 3
| Detroit
| 60-66
| Jia Perkins (19)
| Jia Perkins (7)
| PriceCantyPerkins (3)
| UIC Pavilion  4,635
| 12-16
|- style="background:#fcc;"
| 29
| August 5
| @ Washington
| 66-71
| Candice Dupree (18)
| Chasity Melvin (12)
| Dominique Canty (5)
| Verizon Center  8,395
| 12-17
|- style="background:#fcc;"
| 30
| August 7
| Indiana
| 70-75 2OT
| Chasity Melvin (26)
| Candice Dupree (20)
| CantyDalesPerkins (4)
| UIC Pavilion  5,029
| 12-18
|- style="background:#fcc;"
| 31
| August 11
| Connecticut
| 66-88
| Candice Dupree (18)
| Candice Dupree (6)
| MelvinPerkins (4)
| UIC Pavilion  4,261
| 12-19
|- style="background:#cfc;"
| 32
| August 14
| New York
| 77-65
| Jia Perkins (24)
| Brooke Wyckoff (10)
| Dominique Canty (9)
| UIC Pavilion  5,443
| 13-19
|- style="background:#cfc;"
| 33
| August 16
| @ Houston
| 81-70
| Stacey Dales (17)
| Candice Dupree (9)
| Dominique Canty (7)
| Toyota Center  6,814
| 14-19
|- style="background:#fcc;"
| 34
| August 19
| @ New York
| 52-58
| Dominique Canty (14)
| Brooke Wyckoff (9)
| Dominique Canty (2)
| Madison Square Garden  9,520
| 14-20

Standings

Statistics

Regular Season

Awards and Honors

References

 

Chicago Sky seasons
Chicago
Chicago Sky